Dondoli Mosque is a mosque built in the Sudanese architectural style in the village of Dondoli in Wa in the Upper West region in Ghana. It was named after the neighborhood the mosque is.

History 
It was claimed a man called Karimafa who migrated from Mali to Wa built the mosque. It was claimed the mosque was used to be called Karimafa Mosque after the founder. It was claimed it was built in the 19th century. Most communities in the Northern part of Ghana are Muslim. In about the 10th century AD, Islam was said to enter Africa. It moved from Egypt to the Western and Southern parts because along the gold trade routes. 

In Ghana, Islamic traders, Mande warriors and other missionaries used these trade routes. Sometimes these routes were marked by the incursions by the Berber Dynasty. This played a major role for the spread of Islam in that area. Mosques were constructed to serve as resting points for some of these Islamic traders.

Features 
Like other mosques in Northern and Savannah Regions of Ghana, Dondoli Mosque is built in the traditional Sudanic-Sahelian architectural style, using local materials and construction techniques.

References 

19th-century mosques
Mosques in Ghana
Upper West Region
19th-century establishments in Gold Coast (British colony)
Sudano-Sahelian architecture